HD 216770 b is an extrasolar planet orbiting the star HD 216770. It has a mass about two thirds that of Jupiter, largest planet in the Solar System. But unlike the gas giants in the Solar System, it orbits in a very eccentric orbit around the star. The mean distance from the star is slightly larger than Mercury's, and it completes one orbit around the star in every 118 days.

See also
 HD 10647 b
 HD 108874 b
 HD 111232 b
 HD 142415 b
 HD 169830 c
 HD 41004 Ab
 HD 65216 b

References

External links
 
 

Piscis Austrinus
Exoplanets discovered in 2003
Giant planets
Exoplanets detected by radial velocity